Judith Bakirya is a Ugandan permaculture farmer. She was named one of the BBC's 100 Women for 2019.

Early life and education 
Bakirya was born in the Bugosa District of Uganda, and raised on a farm, though she did not initially intend to be a farmer. As a child, in addition to working on her family's farm, Bakirya and her sisters attended school, thanks to the assistance of her father, a chief. Her success at her primary school qualified her for a scholarship to the prestigious secondary school, Mt St Mary's College Namagunga, something no other student at her school had accomplished. From there, she qualified for a government scholarship to attend university, and earned a Masters in health and development from Birmingham University in the UK.

Career 
In 2000, Bakirya quit her job at an NGO in order to return to farming. Using her savings and a small loan from the village Savings and Loans Association, she founded Busaino Fruits & Trees . In 2014, she won the Best Farmers competition sponsored by Vision Group, the Netherlands Embassy in Uganda, KLM Airlines and dfcu Bank. The prize included a chance to exhibit at the Source of the Nile Agriculture Show and to attend agricultural exhibitions in the Netherlands. After this, she opened her own exhibition centre for traditional medicine and culture in Uganda's Jinja District. In 2017, she began the National Agro-Tourism Institute in Jinja to further promote Ugandan agro-tourism and education.

Bakirya now runs Busaino Fruits & Trees as an agro-heritage fruit farm of more than 1,000 acres, with a heavy emphasis on agro-tourism and education regarding environmentally sustainable farming practices. In 2019, this work led to her recognition as one of the BBC's "100 Women" for the year.

References 

Living people
Year of birth missing (living people)
BBC 100 Women
Ugandan women
Permaculturalists
Ugandan farmers
Women farmers